The Schalfkogel is a mountain in the Schnalskamm group of the Ötztal Alps.

Avalanche 
The 2009 Schalfkogel avalanche occurred in the municipality of Sölden (20km from the town itself), Austria on 3 May 2009. Six people were killed, five Czechs and one Slovak, when the disaster struck in the 3,500-metre (11,000 ft) Schalfkogel mountain range. The corpses were discovered to have been frozen. It was the deadliest avalanche to occur in Austria since March 2000. Although avalanches are a regular occurrence in the region, they mainly kill individuals as opposed to entire groups.

References

Mountains of Tyrol (state)
Mountains of the Alps
Alpine three-thousanders
Ötztal Alps